6D, 6d, or 6-D may refer to:

Canon EOS 6D, a digital SLR camera
Jamaica 6d abolition of slavery postage stamp, a 1921 stamp issue
Six-dimensional space, any space that has six dimensions
6D, the production code for the 1983 Doctor Who serial Snakedance

Aircraft
Boeing Model 6D, an American biplane flying-boat
B-6D, a model of Xian H-6
Grumman KA-6D, a model of Grumman A-6 Intruder
F-6D Mustang, a model of North American P-51 Mustang
North American AT-6D Texan, a model of North American T-6 Texan
OH-6D, a model of Hughes OH-6 Cayuse
XP-6D, a model of Curtiss P-6 Hawk

See also
Sixpence (disambiguation)
D6 (disambiguation)